Oteșani is a commune located in Vâlcea County, Oltenia, Romania. It is composed of five villages: Bogdănești, Cârstănești, Cucești, Oteșani and Sub-Deal.

References

Communes in Vâlcea County
Localities in Oltenia